"Thin Line Between Love and Hate" is the title of a 1971 song by the New York City-based R&B vocal group The Persuaders. The song was written and produced by the Poindexter brothers, Robert and Richard, and was also co-written by Robert's wife, Jackie Members.

Composition
The song tells a story about a man coming home early in the morning to his understanding wife one too many times; after the song's bridge, he finds himself lying in a hospital, bandaged from head to foot.

Chart history
This was the group's biggest hit song, spending two weeks atop the Billboard R&B chart in late 1971. It also reached #15 on the Billboard Hot 100 chart and was a certified Gold Record by the RIAA.

Cover versions

The song has been covered or sampled by many musical acts.
The rock band The Pretenders recorded a cover version of this song, included on their 1984 album Learning to Crawl. Featuring Paul Carrack on keyboards and backing vocals, it was released as a single, peaking at #83 on the Billboard Hot 100 chart and #49 on the UK Singles Chart. This version changed the lyric from first-person viewpoint to second-person.
Jamaican reggae singer B.B. Seaton recorded a version as the title track of his 1973 album for Trojan Records.
A sample of "Thin Line Between Love and Hate" was featured in the song "Washed Away" by the hip-hop band Arrested Development. This song can be found on their 1992 album 3 Years, 5 Months & 2 Days in the Life Of....
Also in 1992, rapper Kid Frost sampled this song on his track "Thin Line". This song is included on his album East Side Story and reached #82 on the Billboard R&B chart.
In 1995, Annie Lennox recorded a cover, featured on her second solo album Medusa.
In 1996, R&B vocal trio H-Town recorded the song, which was included in the film A Thin Line Between Love and Hate starring Martin Lawrence. Released as "A Thin Line Between Love & Hate", this version featured Roger Troutman, and Shirley Murdock on female vocals and reached #6 on the Billboard R&B chart and #37 on the Billboard Hot 100.

See also
R&B number-one hits of 1971 (USA)

References

External links
1971 Persuaders single info From discogs.com
1984 Pretenders single info From discogs.com

1971 singles
1984 singles
1996 singles
The Persuaders (R&B group) songs
The Pretenders songs
H-Town (band) songs
Atco Records singles
1971 songs